Chemsakiellus taurus is a species of beetle in the family Cerambycidae, and the only species in the genus Chemsakiellus. It was described by Villiers in 1982.

References

Tragocephalini
Beetles described in 1982